The Ramon Margalef Prize in Ecology is a prize awarded annually by the Generalitat de Catalunya to recognize an exceptional scientific career or discovery in the field of ecology or other environmental sciences. The award was created to honor the life and work of Ramon Margalef. It is open to ecologists from anywhere in the world.

Awardees

 2005 — Paul K. Dayton 
 2006 — John Lawton 
 2007 — Harold A. Mooney 
 2008 — Daniel Pauly 
 2009 — Paul R. Ehrlich 
 2010 — Simon A. Levin 
 2011 — Juan Carlos Castilla 
 2012 — Daniel Simberloff
 2013 — Sallie W. Chisholm
 2014 — David Tilman
 2015 — Robert E. Ricklefs
 2016 — Josep Peñuelas
 2017 — Sandra Díaz
 2018 — Stephen R. Carpenter
 2019 — Carlos M. Duarte
2020 — Sandra Lavorel
 2021 — Jordi Bascompte
 2022 - Gretchen C. Daily

Published lectures

See also

 List of ecology awards

References

External links
 

Awards established in 2004
Ecology awards
Catalan awards